Anthony Michael Milone (September 24, 1932 – May 17, 2018) was an American prelate of the Roman Catholic Church who served as the sixth bishop of the Diocese of Great Falls-Billings in Montana from 1988 to 2006. He previously served as an auxiliary bishop of the Archdiocese of Omaha in Nebraska from 1981 to 1988.

Biography

Early life 
Anthony Milone was born on September 24, 1932, in Omaha, Nebraska, where he attended Creighton Prep. He studied at the seminary at Conception Abbey in Conception, Missouri, the North American College in Rome, and the Gregorian University in Rome. On December 15, 1957, Milone was ordained a priest in the Archdiocese of Omaha.

Auxiliary Bishop of Omaha 
On November 10, 1981, Milone was appointed titular bishop of Plestia and auxiliary bishop of Omaha by Pope John Paul II. He was consecrated by the pope on January 6, 1982. .

Bishop of Great Falls-Billings 
On December 14, 1987, Milone  was appointed Bishop of Great Falls-Billings by John Paul II and installed on February 23, 1988. At one point, Milone went to Mass and received the eucharist from Padre Pio.

Pope Benedict XVI accepted Milone's resignation as bishop of Great Falls-Billings for reasons of health on July 12, 2006. Anthony Milone died in Omaha on May 17, 2018, at age 85.

See also

References

External links
Roman Catholic Diocese of Great Falls–Billings Official Site

Episcopal succession

1932 births
2018 deaths
Catholics from Nebraska
Catholics from Montana
Roman Catholic bishops of Great Falls–Billings
20th-century Roman Catholic bishops in the United States
21st-century Roman Catholic bishops in the United States
Clergy from Omaha, Nebraska
Roman Catholic Archdiocese of Omaha